When Women Were Called Virgins is a 1972 commedia sexy all'italiana written and directed by  Aldo Grimaldi. It is part of a series of derivative erotic comedies set in the Middle Ages which were based on the success of Pier Paolo Pasolini's The Decameron.

Plot 
During the Middle Ages, the young Gisippo, Ruberto and Tazio go to Prato to attend the trial of Giulia, guilty of having betrayed her husband Romildo (lazy and too "fast" during the sexual act) and for which she is expected to be sentenced to the stake. Giulia, however, beautiful and convincing, touches the judge's heart and gets permission to try again to make love once more before being sentenced. Since one of the three young men supported Giulia's apology during the trial, Romildo's uncle invites them to his house where he offers him the opportunity to indulge in the most unbridled and vulgar pleasures with three eager girls his guests and named Peronella, Francesca and Lucia.

Although Peronella readily gives herself to Tazio, the other two young men are not so lucky — Francesca has a very jealous uncle, a friar (even if in reality he is a great pleasure-seeker) while Lucia is afraid of confronting the other sex. Gisippo and Ruberto disguise themselves as women and manage to successfully overcome the girls' fears. In the end, the three boys continue to pursue their sexual adventures, while Madonna Giulia decides to offer her favors as a great seductress and prostitute to Judge Don Cecco in return for acquittal.

Cast 
Edwige Fenech as Giulia Varrone 
Vittorio Caprioli as  Ser Cecco 
Stefania Careddu as  Francesca
Don Backy as  Marcuzio dei Lucani
Jürgen Drews as Ruberto
 Paolo Turco as  Tazio
 Antonia Brancati as  Lucia
Mario Carotenuto as  Quinto Fulvo
 Carlo De Mejo as  Gisippo
 Francesca Benedetti as  Gisa
Peter Berling as  Romildo Varrone
Carletto Sposito as  Friar Mariaccio
 Eva Garden as  Peronella

See also
 List of Italian films of 1972

References

External links

Commedia sexy all'italiana
1970s sex comedy films
Films directed by Aldo Grimaldi
West German films
Films set in Prato
Films with screenplays by Giovanni Grimaldi
1972 comedy films
1972 films
1970s Italian films